Funny Stories is a 1962 Soviet comedy film directed by Venyamin Dorman. It is the first film adapted from Victor Dragunsky's popular children's book The Adventures of Dennis, a collection of short stories told from the perspective of a young boy.

Plot 
The film tells about three children living in a usual courtyard in the capital of the Soviet Union. They love to visit the circus and the zoo, but they do not tolerate the semolina and house manager, who always watches them and does not allow them to perform various tricks in the yard.

Cast 
 Mikhail Kislyarov as Deniska Korablyev (as Misha Kislyarov)
 Aleksandr Kekish as Mishka Slonov (as Sasha Kekish)
 Nadezhda Fomintsina as Alenka (as Nadya Fomintsina)
 Yelena Druzhinina as Lenochka (as Lena Druzhinina)
 Tamara Loginova as Antonina Korablyeva
 Georgi Tusuzov as Yubilyar (as G. Tusuzov)
 Yury Medvedev as Avdomkim Ivanovich upra (as Yu. Medvedev)
 Oleg Anofriyev as Fedka
Vadim Zakharchenko as militiaman
 Sergey Martinson
 Emma Treyvas

References

External links 
 

1962 films
1960s Russian-language films
Soviet comedy films
1962 comedy films